Freedom Wall is a mural depicting project, started in the wake of "Azadi Ka Amrit Mahotsav" to commemorate the Indian freedom fighters and prolific figures.

The project, started by Dushyant Dubey, Sameer Kulkarni and Satyajit Indramohan, project aims to raise awareness about Indian freedom fighters, forgotten heroes, and contemporary figures of the country. It has depicted murals in several streets of Bangalore.

See also
Freedom Wall - in the United States

References

2020s murals
Culture of Bangalore